Boothipuram is a panchayat town in Theni district  in the state of Tamil Nadu, India.

Demographics

 India census, Boothipuram had a population of 9623. Males constitute 51% of the population and females 49%. Boothipuram has an average literacy rate of 60%, higher than the national average of 59.5%; with male literacy of 69% and female literacy of 50%. 12% of the population is under 6 years of age.

It consists of 15 wards with 2 small villages (Vaalaiyathu patti, Aathi patti).

Schools 
 Government Higher Secondary School, Boothipuram
 Government Elementary School, Boothipuram
 Kallar Middle School, Boothipuram
 Kalaimagal English Schools, Boothipuram
 Devi Kalakendra English Schools, Boothipuram

Major festivals 

Varatharaja perumal (Vaikunda Aagathesi)
Urkavalappan kovil (Periya Kumbudu), (Maddu Pongal, January 15)
Sannasiyapan kovil (Tamil New Year)
Kowmariyamman kovil (Chithirai pongal)
Kaaliyamman kovil festival

Water Resources
Kottakudi river
Vaalaiyar river
Raja Bobalasamuthiram pond

References

Cities and towns in Theni district